Wingate is a village in County Durham, England.

Wingate is a former pit village with a mixture of 19th-century, post-war, and more recent housing developments. It was originally inhabited by around 30 farmers before 1839 when coal was discovered. It is located in the East of County Durham, three miles south west of Peterlee, and seven miles north west of Hartlepool. As with most villages in the area, it grew rapidly with the development of coal-mining in the region.

The name Wingate is said to derive from the Anglo-Saxon words windig (windy) and geat (road) meaning windy road. Like many County Durham villages, residents are known to speak the pitmatic dialect although new housing developments has seen a sharp increase in the village's population.

History

There is no evidence of settlement at Wingate until the 16th century. However, mining made its presence felt in the 19th century and Wingate became a large settlement and regional centre for the area. The village is located approximately two miles east of the original settlement, which is now called Old Wingate. Coal was discovered in 1839 when two shafts were sunk; coal was drawn in December 1839. In 1906, an explosion in the mine killed 26 pit workers in Wingate, and in 2006 a march took place to commemorate the miners.

On 7 January 1971, the Avro Vulcan bomber XM610 crashed near to the school after suffering an engine fire due to metal fatigue in the number 1 engine. The pilot remained in the burning aircraft before he ejected to direct the aircraft to crash into the sea; however. the aircraft later spiralled down into the village and crashed, leaving a large crater. There were no fatalities in the accident. The pilot was awarded a medal for steering the bomber away from Wingate Junior School.

Wingate is also the birthplace of Ted Harrison, a Canadian artist notable for his paintings of the Yukon.

Governance
An electoral ward in the same name exists. This ward stretches north east to Peterlee and has a total population, taken at the 2011 census, of 10,302.

Transport

Car travel

The village has ready access to road links for commuters, with the A181 leading westward to Durham and then north and south via the A1.  Heading east towards the east Durham coast will lead you to the north and south bound A19, with links to Peterlee, Sunderland and Teesside. The main road through the village is the B1280.

Public transport

Public transport is provided by Arriva North East services 57, 57A, 58 and X21, and Go North East services 55, 202 and 239. Buses serve a range of destinations including: Darlington, Durham, Hartlepool, Middlesbrough, Peterlee, Stockton-on-Tees and Sunderland.

Both stations are long closed and the majority of the former right of way has been reclaimed and turned into walkways, notably parts of the Hart to Haswell Walkway. One of the level crossing gates survives next to the Railway Crossings pub on Front Street.

See also
Wellfield School, in Wingate

References

 
Villages in County Durham
Civil parishes in County Durham